Lixnaw Hurling Club is a Gaelic Athletic Association club in the north of County Kerry, Ireland. They primarily play in competitions organised by the Kerry County Board of the GAA, such as the Kerry Senior Hurling Championship, and also in competitions organised by the North Kerry Hurling Board. The club is principally concerned with the game of hurling but many of their players also play gaelic football, many with Finuge. The club has won 9 Kerry Senior Hurling Championships, 10 Kerry Minor Hurling Championships and 5 Kerry Under-21 Hurling Championships.

History 
While the history of hurling in Lixnaw long precedes the founding of the GAA, the club was officially founded in 1888. As reported in the Kerry Sentinel newspaper on Saturday, 17 November 1888, the new club was designated Erin's Hope - Lixnaw and Irremore Branch. The first president was John Trant with Michael Ryan as vice-president. William O'Halloran and John J. Quilter were honorary secretaries with Denis Daly as treasurer. The first club captain was Thomas McCarthy with John Brosnan as vice-captain.

During the following year the separation of the sporting codes became evident with hurling being principally played in Lixnaw and football in Irremore. The hurling club in Lixnaw went by the moniker "Sir Charles Russell" for a time, in honour of an Irish statesman and supporter of Irish Home Rule and the Irish Land League. The naming of clubs and teams in such a fashion being commonplace at the time. The division of the Lixnaw and Irremore elements of the branch took place at this time and the latter competed with some success in the Kerry Football Championship. The Irremore area continues as a source of players for both Finuge and St. Senan's Gaelic football clubs. While football was also played in Lixnaw at this time, the predominance of hurling was increasingly evident.

When neighbouring Ballyduff, representing Kerry, successfully contested the 1891 All-Ireland hurling final, they included players from Kilmoyley and Ardfert and three men from Ahabeg in Lixnaw, Maurice Fitzmaurice, Maurice Kelly and John Murphy.

Roll of honour 
Kerry County Board
Kerry Senior Hurling Championship (9) 1933, 1954, 1983, 1985, 1999, 2005, 2007, 2014, 2018
 Kerry Under 21 Hurling Championship (5) 1999, 2002, 2003, 2004, 2016
 Kerry Minor Hurling Championship (10) 1958, 1963, 1965, 1974, 1976, 1997, 2004, 2012, 2014, 2015
 Kerry Minor B Hurling Championship (1) 2006
Kerry Intermediate Hurling Championship (1) 1973
Kerry Junior Hurling Championship (3) 1954, 1995, 1999
 Kerry Senior Hurling League Division 1 (2) 1979, 1982
North Kerry Hurling Board
 North Kerry Senior Hurling Championship (3) 1964, 1998, 2011
 North Kerry Intermediate Hurling Championship (4) 1973, 1976, 1995, 2022
 North Kerry Under 21 Hurling Championship (2) 1978, 2016
 North Kerry Junior Hurling Championship (1) 1988
 North Kerry Minor Hurling Championship (11) 1956, 1961, 1965, 1976, 1983, 1996, 1997, 2001, 2015, 2016, 2017
 North Kerry Minor B Hurling Championship (3) 1993, 1995, 2018
 North Kerry Senior Hurling League (13) 1942, 1950, 1953, 1954, 1956, 1959, 1960, 1963, 1982, 1983, 2010, 2016, 2017
 North Kerry Senior B Hurling League (6) 1989, 1993, 1995, 1999, 2002, 2012
 North Kerry Intermediate Hurling League (2) 1964*,1977 (* as Ballinclogher)
 North Kerry Junior Hurling League (6) 1942*, 1944*, 1948, 1958*, 1960*, 1994 (* as Ballinclogher)

County Senior Championship Winning Captains 

 1933: Joe McCarthy
 1954: Jim Hogan
 1983: Moss McKenna
 1985: Moss Allen
 1999: Trevor McKenna
 2005: Fergus Fitzmaurice
 2007: Patrick Dowling
 2014: Maurice Corridan
 2018: Darragh Shanahan

Famous players 
Maurice Fitzmaurice,
Steve Grady (Co-founder of The North Kerry Hurling Board),
John McElligott,
Jack Kennedy (Co-founder of Ladies Walk Club),
Moss Fitzmaurice,
Christy Ring (guest appearance),
Eugie Stack,
Jimmy Hogan,
Richie McElligott (nominated for Sunday Independent GAA Team of the Century in 1984 and in whose honour the All-Ireland U20B hurling championship trophy is named),
Topper McElligott,
Moss Lyons,
Johnny Conway,
Sean Flaherty,
Paul Galvin,
Eamonn Fitzmaurice,
Ricky Heffernan,
John "Tweek" Griffin,
James Flaherty,
Michael Conway,
Shane Conway

Notable External Managers 
Aside from the team management, coaching and training functions provided to Lixnaw hurling teams since its establishment by members of the club itself, there have also been a number of managers from outside the club who have been influential, particularly since the start of the 21st century. The following former Limerick, Cork and Tipperary players have had management and training roles with the club's senior team in particular.
Éamonn Cregan
 Liam O'Donoghue
 Brian Begley
 Ciaran Carey & Mark Foley
Seánie McGrath
Conor Gleeson

Colours and crest 
The club has worn a green and gold jersey from the earliest records available. The traditional pattern worn is green with a gold hoop.

The use of an alternate kit to address a clash of colours has only occurred since 2003, when it was used for the first time in the Kerry Senior Championship final. As is generally the case with all GAA clubs, its use is not agreed to lightly given the strong affiliation between club and colours. The alternate or change kit used by many clubs is a variation or inverse of the normal kit or will use a neutral white jersey. Atypically, Lixnaw have adopted the use of a distinctive blue jersey, which mirrors the alternate kit (based on the Munster GAA colours) used by the Kerry team over many decades. While the green and gold jersey is synonymous with Lixnaw, the blue alternate has been associated with a number of memorable successes on the field of play.

The club's crest was designed in 2001 and consists of an image of the Hermitage in Lixnaw with a representation of the nearby river Brick and a salmon on a shield and circlet bearing the name of the club, celtic knotwork and crossed hurleys.

References

External links 
 Lixnaw Official Website - http://www.lixnawgaa.ie/
 Lixnaw Official Facebook - https://www.facebook.com/LixnawGAAClub
 Lixnaw Official Twitter - @LixnawGAA

Gaelic games clubs in County Kerry
Hurling clubs in County Kerry